Loska is a surname. Notable people with the surname include:

Gienek Loska (born 1975), Polish singer-songwriter and guitarist
Stanislav Loska (born 1968), Czech alpine skier
Tomasz Loska (born 1996), Polish footballer
Tony Loska (born 1950), English footballer